Platovo is a rural locality (a selo) in Albazinsky Selsoviet of Zavitinsky District, Amur Oblast, Russia. The population was 28 as of 2018. There is 1 street.

Geography 
Platovo is located on the left bank of the Zavitaya River, 37 km west of Zavitinsk (the district's administrative centre) by road. Albazinka is the nearest rural locality.

References 

Rural localities in Zavitinsky District